Herbert Dale (January 1867 – December 1925) was an English footballer who played as a forward. Born in Stoke on Trent, Staffordshire, he played for Newton Heath and made an appearance for the Manchester FA representative side.

External links
Profile at MUFCInfo.com

1867 births
1925 deaths
English footballers
Manchester United F.C. players
Association football forwards